Seyfabad (also Romanized as Seyfābād and Saifābād; also known as Sa‘īdābād) is a village in Ramand-e Shomali Rural District, Khorramdasht District, Takestan County, Qazvin Province, Iran. At the 2006 census, its population was 878, in 249 families.

References 

Populated places in Takestan County